Axinolobidae is one of five families of the Schistoceratoidea, a superfamily included in the Goniatitida, an extinct order of ammonoid cephalopods that lived during the late Paleozoic.

References
 The Paleobiology Database accessed on 10/01/07

Goniatitida families
Schistocerataceae